Baladeyet El Mahalla Sporting Club, is an Egyptian football club based in El Mahalla, Egypt. The club is currently playing in the Egyptian Second Division, the second-highest league in the Egyptian football league system.

Performance in CAF competitions
FR = First round
SR = Second round
QF = Quarter-final

1931 establishments in Egypt
Egyptian Second Division
Football clubs in Egypt